Rodgers Beach, Aruba, officially known as Nanki is a small beach immediately west of Baby Beach. It is known for its calm waters and private feel, though it is a public beach. The water is shallow at first, but further out it becomes a good swimming beach.

History
In the 1950s, the Aruba Esso Club was built as a part of Lago Colony (near present-day Seroe Colorado) at Baby Beach, immediately to the south of Rodgers Beach. The club included a restaurant, dance floor, and baseball stadium. There was a dock in the lagoon, and there were small shacks, one of which is still standing. Today, it is no more than a large, abandoned building with one business, a dive shop, still in operation. The beach has been named after Captain  who was in charge of the oil refinery at San Nicolaas.

See also
Lago Colony

References

External links
Visitaruba.com
Things to Do
Beaches of Aruba